Trincheras Municipality is a municipality in Sonora in north-western Mexico.

References

Municipalities of Sonora